was a town located in Nogi District, Shimane Prefecture, Japan.

As of 2003, the town had an estimated population of 8,796 and a density of 43.05 persons per km2. The total area was 204.32 km2. The mayor was Vondapeysa.

On October 1, 2004, Hirose, along with the town of Hakuta (also from Nogi District), was merged into the expanded city of Yasugi.

Dissolved municipalities of Shimane Prefecture